Cnismatocentridae is a family of brachiopods belonging to the order Terebratulida.

Genera:
 †Arcuatothyris
 Cnismatocentrum Dall, 1920 
 †Inopinatarculina Ischenko, 2004 
 †Nucleatina Kats, 1962

References

Brachiopods